Andreas Hanni (born January 4, 1979) is a Swiss former professional ice hockey defenceman. He played in Switzerland's Nationalliga A for HC Ambrì-Piotta, HC Lugano, SC Bern and EHC Biel

He has followed a vegan diet since he was 18 for ethical reasons.

References

External links

1979 births
Living people
ECH Chur players
EHC Biel players
HC Ambrì-Piotta players
HC Lugano players
Lausanne HC players
SC Bern players
Swiss ice hockey defencemen